is Toei Company's 35th entry in its long-running Super Sentai metaseries of Japanese tokusatsu television series following Tensou Sentai Goseiger. It follows a Pirate motif and premiered on TV Asahi on February 13, 2011, joining Kamen Rider OOO and then Kamen Rider Fourze as a program featured in TV Asahi's Super Hero Time programming block, until Gokaiger 's conclusion on February 19, 2012.

Gokaiger is a special anniversary series. Its protagonists are able to transform into not only their own unique, pirate-themed forms, but also all of the previous 34 Super Sentai teams, each of which have their own unique power that the Gokaigers can access. The series and related films also features reappearances of actors reprising their characters from each of the previous series.

Kaizoku Sentai Gokaiger began airing in South Korea in July 2012 as Power Rangers Captain Force (Hangul: 파워레인저 캡틴포스; RR: Paweoraeinjeo Kaebtinposeu). Its footage was used for the 2014 American Power Rangers season, Power Rangers Super Megaforce.

Plot

However, they end up facing the Space Empire Zangyack, whose earlier invasion forces were wiped out by the 34 Sentai groups long ago before a new invasion force is established under Commander Warz Gill, the emperor's son. As a result, due to their history with the empire, the space pirates use the powers of the older teams and attempt to master their powers to fight the Zangyack forces as the Gokaigers.

Episodes

Several of the episodes in Gokaiger feature and focus on the actions of one of the Legend Sentai. Those episodes are titled in a fashion similar to that of the original series. For example, episode 3, which features Mahō Sentai Magiranger, has a magic spell as part of the title, while episode 7, which features Juken Sentai Gekiranger, features one of the nonsense phrases that series protagonist Jyan Kandou would use.

Production
On July 30, 2010, Toei applied for trademarks on the title  to be used on various products. The Japan Patent Office approved these trademarks on August 26, 2010. During the Super Sentai VS Theater programming on December 26, 2010, the series was officially announced in a commercial. A Tokyo Dome City event for the premiere, serving as the introduction of the cast and theme song singers to the public, held on January 29 and 30, 2011.

Films
In addition to the protagonists' debut in Tensou Sentai Goseiger vs. Shinkenger: Epic on Ginmaku, Gokaiger has five theatrical releases where they are the primary characters.

Super Sentai 35th anniversary film

 is the film commemorating the 35th anniversary of the Super Sentai Series. The film primarily featured the casts of Gokaiger and Tensou Sentai Goseiger, among the 199 total heroes from the Super Sentai series to appear. The film was originally scheduled for release on May 21, 2011. However, due to the 2011 Tōhoku earthquake and tsunami, filming was affected and the film's release was postponed until June 11. The addition of Gokai Silver is revealed at the end of the movie and he goes on to appear in his TV debut in the episode "The Awesome Silver Man" released the following day. The event of the movie takes place between episode 16 and 17. This film is a tribute to Himitsu Sentai Gorenger.

The Flying Ghost Ship

 is the main theatrical release for Gokaiger where the Gokai Galleon crew deal with revived enemies under the captain of a ghost ship. It was released on August 6, 2011, alongside the film for Kamen Rider OOO. The event of the movie takes place between episode 23 and 24.

Gokaiger vs. Gavan

The film  was released in theaters on January 21, 2012. This is the first Vs. Series crossover film that does not feature another Super Sentai team, but the hero of the first Metal Hero Series: Space Sheriff Gavan. The heroes of Tokumei Sentai Go-Busters also make a cameo appearance in the film. The event of the movie takes place between episode 46 and 47.

Super Hero Taisen

 is a film which features a crossover between the characters of the Super Sentai and Kamen Rider Series. The protagonists of Gokaiger and Kamen Rider Decade are featured, as well as those of Kamen Rider Fourze, Kamen Rider OOO, and Go-Busters.

Go-Busters vs. Gokaiger

 was released in theaters on January 19, 2013. As with previous VS movies, it features a crossover between the casts of Gokaiger and Go-Busters, along the debut of the 37th Super Sentai, Zyuden Sentai Kyoryuger.

Super Hero Taisen Z

 was released on April 27, 2013. It features the first crossover between characters of Toei's three main Tokusatsu franchises, Kamen Rider, Super Sentai, and the Metal Hero Series represented mainly by the Space Sheriff Series. The protagonists of Space Sheriff Gavan: The Movie, Tokumei Sentai Go-Busters, and Kaizoku Sentai Gokaiger are featured, but the casts of Kamen Rider Wizard, Zyuden Sentai Kyoryuger, and Kamen Rider Fourze also participate in the film. Junya Ikeda reprises his role as Gai Ikari, while Ryota Ozawa returns only to voice Gokai Red.

Kyuranger vs. Space Squad

 is a V-Cinema release that features a crossover between Uchu Sentai Kyuranger and Space Squad. Aside from the main cast of Kyuranger, Yuma Ishigaki and Hiroaki Iwanaga (Space Sheriff Gavan: The Movie), Yuka Hirata (Juken Sentai Gekiranger), Mitsuru Karahashi (Samurai Sentai Shinkenger), Kei Hosogai (Kaizoku Sentai Gokaiger) and Ayame Misaki (Tokumei Sentai Go-Busters) return to reprise their respective roles. The V-Cinema was released on DVD and Blu-ray on August 8, 2018.

Red Battle! All Sentai Great Assemble!!
Naoya Makoto (Himitsu Sentai Gorenger), Kei Hosogai (Kaizoku Sentai Gokaiger), and Jingi Irie (Kaitou Sentai Lupinranger VS Keisatsu Sentai Patranger) reprise their respective roles, and Nobutoshi Canna (Doubutsu Sentai Zyuohger) and Megumi Han (Shuriken Sentai Ninninger) reprise their respective voice roles.

Special DVD
 is a special DVD by Kodansha that is used to show some of the items in the series. In this special, taking place after episode 38, Captain Marvelous and Gai are accidentally fused together in one body during Insarn's attempt to fuse Gai with Karizorg, an android in Barizorg's image. Determined to retrieve Insarn's gun and restore themselves, Gai is allowed free use of their body to transform into a version of Gokai Silver with Gokai Red's helmet and boots as he assumes the forms of the previous 34 Super Sentai red warriors and Gokai Red to defeat dozens of Gormin. Though Gai gets exhausted from the overuse while Insarn fuses Karizorg with a Zugormin to create Zugozorg, Marvelous takes over their body and uses Gold Anchor Key to become  and finish off Zugozorg. The fusion gets Insarn's gun as she retreats, separating back to normal. Back aboard the Gokai Galleon, Gai offers the Captain a strawberry/vanilla swirl ice cream before an argument between them has Navi use the fusion gun on them.

V-Cinema

Ten Gokaiger

Gokaiger initially had a V-Cinema adaptation planned before it was canceled in the aftermath of the 2011 Tōhoku earthquake.  is a V-Cinema release which received a limited theatrical release on November 12, 2021, followed by its DVD and Blu-ray release on March 9, 2022. The V-Cinema commemorates the 10th anniversary of the series, making of Gokaiger the fourth series of the franchise receiving a tenth-anniversary special film after Ninpuu Sentai Hurricaneger, Tokusou Sentai Dekaranger and Engine Sentai Go-onger. In addition, Kohei Shoji reprises his role from Mashin Sentai Kiramager.

Zenkaiger vs. Kiramager vs. Senpaiger
 is an upcoming V-Cinema release that features a crossover between Kikai Sentai Zenkaiger and Mashin Sentai Kiramager. The V-Cinema is scheduled for a limited theatrical release on April 29, 2022, followed by its DVD and Blu-ray release on September 28, 2022. Additionally, Ryota Ozawa will make an appearance, reprising his role as Captain Marvelous/Gokai Red, alongside Asahi Ito of Kaitou Sentai Lupinranger VS Keisatsu Sentai Patranger reprising his role as Kairi Yano/Lupin Red. The events of the V-Cinema take place after the final episode of Zenkaiger.

Web episodes
 is a web-exclusive crossover series released on Toei Tokusatsu Fan Club on June 5, 2022, featuring characters from Gokaiger and Kikai Sentai Zenkaiger. Ryota Ozawa, Yui Koike, and Junya Ikeda return to reprise their respective roles as Captain Marvelous/Gokai Red, Ahim de Famille/Gokai Pink and Gai Ikari/Gokai Silver respectively.

A Day of One Hero

 is a direct-to-video film released on November 21, 2011, starring Kazuki Shimizu as himself in a mockumentary of his acting career as Don "Doc" Dogoier in Gokaiger. The film also features cameo appearances by Tokusatsu veteran actors Yoshio Yamaguchi and Nao Nagasawa.

Video games
 is a Wii action game developed by Bandai Namco Games which features the protagonists of Gokaiger, Tensou Sentai Goseiger, Samurai Sentai Shinkenger, Engine Sentai Go-onger, and Himitsu Sentai Gorenger. It was released on September 9, 2011. The game play is beat-them up like Dynasty Warriors series

A Nintendo DS game for Gokaiger called  was released on November 17, 2011.

Doubutsu Sentai Zyuohger appearance
As part of Doubutsu Sentai Zyuohgers 40th anniversary celebration, the entire Gokaiger cast made a special appearance on episodes 28 (September 4, 2016) and 29 (September 11th, 2016), commemorating the 1,999th and 2,000th episodes of the Super Sentai Series, including a new updated version of the Gokaiger ED titled 'Super Hero Getter 2016'.

Cast
: 
: 
: 
: 
: 
: 
: 
: 
: 
: 
: 
/: 
: 
: 
: 
: 
Narration, Gokaiger Equipment Voice, :

Guest stars

Tsuyoshi Kaijo: 
Aka Red (Voice): 
Kai Ozu: 
Spell Voice: 
Banban "Ban" Akaza: 
Marika "Jasmine" Reimon: 
Doggie Kruger (Voice): 
Kozo Kasugai: 
Jyan Kandou: 
Master Shafu (Voice): 
Cosmic Kenpō Master Pachacamac XIII (Voice): 
Kakeru Shishi: 
Kaoru Shiba: 
Toshizo Tanba: 
Eikichi Nashida: 
Kyosuke Jinnai: 
Mikoto Nakadai: 
Hyuuga: 
Ryouma: 
Satoru Akashi: 
Creator King Ryuuwon (Voice): 
Jaryuu (Voice): 
Matsuri Tatsumi: 
Yousuke Shiina: 
Nanami Nono: 
Kouta Bitou: 
Satarakura Jr. (Voice): 
Sandaaru Jr. (Voice): 
Gai Yuki: 
Yukito Sanjyo: 
Emiri Sanjyo: 
Joh Ohara: 
Goro Hoshino: 
Momo Maruo: 
Ryo of the Heavenly Fire Star: 
Masa: 
Cain: 
Sōsuke Esumi: 
Speedor (Voice): 
Bus-on (Voice): 
Bear-RV (Voice): 
Bomper (Voice): 
Pollution President Babatcheed (Voice): 
Kenta Date: 
Domon: 
Honami Moriyama: 
Shitari of the Bones (Voice): 
Metal-A of the Agent (Voice): 
Zan-KT0 of the Shot (Voice): 
Shiro Akebono: 
Ninjaman (Voice): 
Tsuruhime: 
Takayuki Hiba: 
Sho Hayate: 
Dai: 
Akira: 
Remi Hoshikawa: 
Goushi: 
Professor Shuichiro Amachi: 
Yuka Yamazaki: 
Shoji of the Heavenly Gravity Star: 
Kazu of the Heavenly Time Star: 
Shou Tatsumi: 
Houka Ozu: 
Miu Sutō:

Songs
Opening theme

Lyrics: Yuho Iwasato
Composition: 
Arrangement: Project.R (Hiroaki Kagoshima)
Artist: Tsuyoshi Matsubara (Project.R) with Young Fresh (Project.R)

Ending theme

Lyrics: Shoko Fujibayashi & Naruhisa Arakawa
Composition: Kenichiro Ōishi
Arrangement: Project.R (Kenichiro Ōishi)
Artist: Project.R

The series' ending theme "Super Sentai Hero Getter" lists off all of the Super Sentai series, making reference to their songs and motifs, with each of the three verses of the song being played in rotation. The first verse covers Himitsu Sentai Gorenger through Choujyu Sentai Liveman, which all aired in the Shōwa period; the second covers Kousoku Sentai Turboranger through Mirai Sentai Timeranger, which all aired through the remainder of the 20th century; and the last one covers Hyakujuu Sentai Gaoranger through Tensou Sentai Goseiger, which were all broadcast in the 21st century.

The song is remixed into "Super Sentai Hero Getter ~ 199 ver." from their first team-up movie (eliminating all but one of the choruses) and then "Super Sentai Hero Getter ~ Now & Forever ver." in the final episode, the latter remix covering Gokaiger and Tokumei Sentai Go-Busters.

A second version titled "Super Sentai Hero Getter 2016" was released in episodes 28 and 29 of Doubutsu Sentai Zyuohger during the celebrations of the 2000th episode of the franchise, with two verses, including the first 40 Super Sentai Series. The first verse covers the 20 earlier series from Gorenger to Gekisou Sentai Carranger and the second one covers the 20 late entries, from Denji Sentai Megaranger to Zyuohger.

A third version titled "Super Sentai Hero Getter ~Ten Gokaiger ver.~" was released in 2021 as the ending song of the film Kaizoku Sentai: Ten Gokaiger which celebrates the 10th anniversary of the series, including the first 45 Super Sentai Series in three verses with 15 series each, the first covering from Gorenger to Chōjin Sentai Jetman, the second covering from Kyōryū Sentai Zyuranger to GoGo Sentai Boukenger and the third covering from Juken Sentai Gekiranger to Kikai Sentai Zenkaiger.

Notes

References

External links

 at Toei Company 
 at Super-Sentai.net 
 at Nippon Columbia 
 at Bandai 

Kaizoku Sentai Gokaiger at Television Broadcast Hong

2011 Japanese television series debuts
2012 Japanese television series endings
Super Sentai
Fictional pirates
Space pirates
Crossover tokusatsu television series